Harriet Beauclerk, Duchess of St Albans (alternate spelling: Harriot; née Mellon; 11 November 1777 – 6 August 1837) was a British banker and actress who eventually starred at Drury Lane. She was successively the wife of banker Thomas Coutts and then of William Beauclerk, 9th Duke of St Albans. She was widely celebrated for her beauty, and she was painted by George Romney and Sir Thomas Lawrence.

Early life and first marriage
Mellon, the daughter of Lt. Matthew Mellon, was a strolling player (member of a travelling theatre company) and became an actress.

When she was young, she appeared at the Duke Street Theatre, where she attracted the attention of an elderly wealthy banker, Thomas Coutts, founder of Coutts & Co, the royal bank. Following his wife's death in 1815, she married him.  From his previous marriage, he had three daughters – Susan (wife of the 3rd Earl of Guilford), Frances (wife of the 1st Marquess of Bute), and Sophia (wife of Sir Francis Burdett).

In 1822, after her husband's death, she became very wealthy, having been bequeathed his entire fortune, including his interest in the family bank. She purchased the lease on a country property four miles away at the Holly Lodge in Highgate, holding parties there and at her town house at 78 Stratton Street Piccadilly. She also spent time at her house in Brighton, St Alban's House, 131 Kings Road, on the corner of Regency Square.

Second marriage
In 1827, she married William Beauclerk, 9th Duke of St Albans, who was 23 years her junior. Sir Walter Scott wrote to her to congratulate her. Her reply is quoted in full in his journal for 30 June 1827. They were "old and true friends" and she wrote to him:

On her death in 1837, her property and fortune went to her stepgranddaughter, selected as heir after careful scrutiny of the possible recipients, who as a condition of the inheritance adapted her name to Angela Burdett-Coutts.

See also
List of entertainers who married titled Britishers

References

Further reading
 There is one biography of Harriot Mellon: Joan Perkin's The Merry Duchess (Athena Press, 2002)
Old and New London Illustrated: A Narrative of its History, its People and its Places. Illustrated with numerous engravings from the most Authentic Sources. (6 vols) sub vol. 3&4 combined: Westminster and the Westminster Suburbs. 1881. pp. 278–281.
 Healey, Edna. Coutts & Co 1692–1992: The Portrait of a Private Bank. .

1777 births
1837 deaths
19th-century English actresses
St Albans
19th-century English businesswomen
19th-century English businesspeople
Women of the Regency era